Beverly Woods (born July 30, 1950) is an American politician who served in the Washington House of Representatives from the 23rd district from 1999 to 2007.

References

1950 births
Living people
Republican Party members of the Washington House of Representatives
Women state legislators in Washington (state)